The 1993 NHL Supplemental Draft was the eighth NHL Supplemental Draft. It was held on June 25, 1993. It was limited to the eight teams that missed the 1993 Stanley Cup playoffs and the expansion Mighty Ducks of Anaheim and Florida Panthers.

Selections

See also
1993 NHL Entry Draft
1993 NHL Expansion Draft
1993–94 NHL season
List of NHL players

References

External links
 1993 NHL Supplemental Draft player stats at The Internet Hockey Database

1993
Supplemental Draft